The Zoológico Los Coyotes is the third zoo in Mexico City, Mexico.  It was opened on 2 February 1999 to complement the other zoos of the City of Mexico.  It is built on a site that was previously a centre for seized animals, which it fell into disrepair. It mainly exhibits endemic and native fauna of Mexico including two coyotes, the species that the zoo is named after.

External links
 
—

Parks in Mexico City
Tourist attractions in Mexico City
Zoos established in 1999
Coyotes